Black Linn Falls is a waterfall on the River Braan in The Hermitage, Dunkeld, Scotland. After the falls, the river passes beneath the Hermitage Bridge into a plunge pool.

Ossian's Hall of Mirrors is a popular viewing point of the falls.

Aerial view

Ossian's Hall of Mirrors viewing point

Plunge pool

See also
Waterfalls of Scotland

References

Waterfalls of Perth and Kinross